Rohisala is a village on Saurashtra peninsula and former Rajput non-salute princely state in Gujarat, western India.

History 
Rohisala was a petty princely state, in the Gohelwar prant of Kathiawar, comprising only the village, ruled by Sarvaiya Rajput Chieftains.

It had a population of 411 in 1901, yielding a state revenue of 2,650 Rupees (1903-4, nearly all from land) and a paying a tribute of 111 Rupees, to the Gaekwar Baroda State and Junagarh State.

Sources and external links 
History
 Imperial Gazetteer, on dsal.uchicago.edu

Princely states of Gujarat
Rajput princely states